Drew Hastings (born March 2, 1954) is an American stand-up comedian, author, and former mayor of Hillsboro, Ohio.

Early life
Hastings was born in Casablanca, Morocco to an English mother, Pamela, and an American G.I. father named Drew.  He emigrated to the United States at a young age and grew up in the Midwest, particularly in the Ohio cities of Kettering, Dayton and Cincinnati.

Stand-up comedy
Hastings began performing onstage at the age of thirty-one. After having lived in several large cities in the 1970s, including San Francisco and New York, he had moved back to Ohio.  In the early 1990s, he moved to Los Angeles, where he would later receive several guest-starring roles and television pilots for networks such as Fox, NBC, and HBO.  While in California, he wrote and starred in several one-person shows, including, Commencement Speech, Life & Other Short Stories, and The Business of Living, the latter directed by Bob Odenkirk.  The main character of The Business of Living, a motivational speaker/success guru named "Jack Freeman", gained a cult following in California and has become increasingly popular throughout the Midwest. While living in L.A., he got a rare standing ovation on "The Tonight Show".

Hastings would later sit in as a guest on The Bob & Tom Show.  In 2006, he starred in The Friends of Bob & Tom Comedy Central special alongside other comedians such as Bob Zany, Greg Hahn, and Roy Wood, Jr.

On April 26, 2008, Comedy Central aired Drew Hastings: Irked and Miffed, Hastings' premiere one-hour television special.  The performance was released on May 6, 2008 through Image Entertainment.

Mayoral bid
Hastings expressed interest in running for mayor in the city of Hillsboro, Ohio in June 2010 as a Republican Party candidate. On January 20, 2011, Hastings took out a candidate petition to run for the position of mayor for the city of Hillsboro.

Hastings filed his petition with the county's Board of Elections, as did two other Republican hopefuls. With the city's primary election held on May 3, 2011, Hastings won the primary election with receiving 295 votes. On November 8, 2011, Hastings won the Hillsboro, Ohio general election garnering 1,008 votes and his opponent, John Levo, received 614 votes. He was sworn in on January 2, 2012.

On November 3, 2015, Hastings won a second term as mayor of Hillsboro with 59% of the vote over Pam Limes.

On July 12, 2016, Hastings was indicted on four charges, including elections fraud, following a months-long investigation by special prosecutors appointed by a Highland County judge. The counts included theft, theft in office and tampering with records. The judge in the case dismissed 2 of the 4 felony charges against Hastings, and a jury found him not guilty on the remaining charges on November 9, 2016.

Electoral history

Writing and books
In September 2020, Hastings released The Business of Living, based on his one-person show of the same name. It was written under the pseudonym, Jack Freeman. A satire of the success and self-help genre. https://www.amazon.com/Business-Living-dont-need-success/dp/0578767228/ref=tmm_pap_swatch_0?_encoding=UTF8&qid=1639534942&sr=1-2
 Hastings memoir, "Chasing Drew Hastings; a memoir" was completed in October 2021, and has a February 2022 release date.

Stage and screen
One man shows
Tales Of Unrepentance – Written and performed by Drew Hastings – HBO Theatre, Los Angeles, CA –   1998
The Business of Living – Written and performed by Drew Hastings – HBO Workspace – Los Angeles, CA – 1999
Yard Sale – Written and performed by Drew Hastings – Tamarind Theatre, Los Angeles – 1995
Movies
Melvin Goes to Dinner – 2003 directed by Bob Odenkirk
Let's Go To Prison – 2006 directed by Bob Odenkirk
Television
The Peter Principle – 2000 – Uncredited – Co-starred with Paul F. Tompkins
The Big Wide World Of Carl Laemke - 2003 - Uncredited directed by Bob Odenkirk

Discography
Farmageddon -October 22, 2012
Drew Hastings: Irked and Miffed - May 6, 2008
Bob and Tom Radio: The Comedy Tour - September 19, 2006
I Have No Fight With You People - 2005
I'm Just Like You - 2003

Books

References

External links

Drew Hastings at Comedy Central
http://www.hillsboroohio.net/mayor.html Drew Hastings Hillsboro, Ohio profile

American male comedians
Mayors of places in Ohio
People from Casablanca
People from Kettering, Ohio
Living people
1954 births
American people of English descent
Comedians from Ohio
20th-century American comedians
21st-century American comedians
Ohio Republicans